Max Brendon Costa Pinheiro or simply Max  (born July 10, 1983 in São Luís), is a Brazilian forward who plays for Ríver Atlético Clube.

Honours
Palmeiras
Campeonato Paulista 2008

Contract
1 January 2008 to 31 December 2010

External links
 palmeiras.globo.com
 sambafoot
 
 Guardian Stats Centre
 globoesporte

1983 births
Living people
Brazilian footballers
Sport Club Corinthians Alagoano players
América Futebol Clube (RN) players
Sociedade Esportiva Palmeiras players
Paraná Clube players
Tocantinópolis Esporte Clube players
Esporte Clube Internacional de Lages players
Clube Náutico Capibaribe players
Boavista Sport Club players
Associação Atlética Caldense players
Guarani FC players
Sampaio Corrêa Futebol Clube players
Associação Desportiva Cabofriense players
Tombense Futebol Clube players
Paulista Futebol Clube players
Globo Futebol Clube players
River Atlético Clube players
Campeonato Brasileiro Série B players
Campeonato Brasileiro Série C players
Campeonato Brasileiro Série D players
Association football forwards